Love is an extant  American 1920 silent era romance drama film starring Louise Glaum, James Kirkwood, and Joseph Kilgour. Directed by Wesley Ruggles and produced by J. Parker Read, Jr., the screenplay was adapted by Louis Joseph Vance based on a story by Carol Kapleau.

Plot
A young woman, Natalie Storm (played by Glaum), works in a sweatshop and struggles to support her mother (played by Yorke) and little sister, Beatrice (played by Cartwright). Their mother dies and Beatrice suffers from poverty.

Because of her circumstances, Natalie rejects the marriage proposal of Tom Chandler (played by Kirkwood), a self-educated mining engineer. He then leaves for South America, where he intends to make his fortune. To save her sister and herself, Natalie becomes the mistress of a wealthy Wall Street magnate, Alvin Dunning (played by Kilgour). When he publicly humiliates her, however, she becomes determined to free herself.

Meanwhile, Chandler discovers a copper mine in South America and returns. He is invited to a party at Dunning's home. When he meets Natalie as Dunning's mistress he is heartbroken and abruptly leaves. Natalie is by now desperate to get away from Dunning. She then acquires enough money from a lucky stock tip to leave him.

Dunning finds Natalie and attempts to force her to return to him. He is killed in a violent car accident and Natalie is severely injured. Upon opening her eyes after the crash, she sees Chandler standing over her. The couple is happily reconciled.

Cast in credited order
Louise Glaum as Natalie Storm
Peggy Cartwright as Beatrice Storm
James Kirkwood as Tom Chandler
Joseph Kilgour as Alvin Dunning
Edith Yorke as Natalie's mother
Laura La Plante - (*scenes deleted)

Production
The working title of the movie was The Woman Who Dared. Love was released by J. Parker Read, Jr., on December 5, through Associated Producers. The technical director was Harvey C. Leavitt and the technical director of architecture was Charles H. Kyson. The intertitles were written by H. Tipton Steck. The art titles were by F. J. van Halle, Carl Schneider and Leo H. Braun.

Love was banned by the British Board of Film Censors in 1921.

See also
List of American films of 1920
List of banned films

References

External links

Love at the Internet Movie Database
Love at the AFI Catalog of Feature Films
Love at the Complete Index to World Film

1920 films
American romantic drama films
American silent feature films
American black-and-white films
1920 romantic drama films
Films directed by Wesley Ruggles
1920s American films
Silent romantic drama films
Silent American drama films